McCurley is a surname. Notable people with the surname include:

Anna McCurley (born 1943), Scottish politician
Kevin McCurley (footballer) (1926–2000), English footballer
Kevin McCurley (cryptographer), American mathematician and computer scientist
Scott McCurley, American football player and coach
Shannon McCurley (born 1992), Australian-born Irish cyclist

See also

Curley